Braulio Enrique Musso Reyes  (born March 8, 1930) is a Chilean former footballer who played as a left winger for Universidad de Chile from 1951 to 1968, and was a member of the Chile national football team at the FIFA World Cup Chile 1962, but did not play in any games.

Honours
Universidad de Chile
 Chilean Primera División 1959, 1962, 1964, 1965 and 1967 (Chilean Championship)

References

1930 births
Living people
Chilean footballers
Association football wingers
Chile international footballers
Universidad de Chile footballers
1962 FIFA World Cup players